Madill can refer to:

Places:
 Madill, Oklahoma

People:
 Ellwood Madill (1915–1999), Canadian politician
 Frank Madill (Canadian politician) (1852–1895)
 Frank Madill (Australian politician) (born 1941), Tasmanian politician
 Henry J. Madill (1829–?), US Army colonel
 Jeff Madill (born 1965), Canadian ice hockey player
 Luke Madill (born 1980), Australian BMX cyclist
 Maureen Madill (born 1958), Irish golfer and broadcaster
 Mike Madill (born 1982), Canadian ice hockey player